Davide Biondini (born 24 January 1983) is an Italian former professional footballer who played as a midfielder.

Club career

Cesena
Biondini started his career at Cesena, near his birthplace. After playing more than 40 Serie C1 games, he left the club.

Vicenza
Biondini was transferred to Serie B team Vicenza Calcio in temporary deal in 2003. in 2004 the Veneto club acquired Biondini in co-ownership deal for €250,000. In June 2005 Vicenza acquired Biondini outright after winning the bid mediated by Lega Calcio for €202,500.

Reggina
In August 2005 Biondini was signed by Serie A club Reggina Calcio in another co-ownership deal for €500,000, which the Calabria team also signed Luca Rigoni from Veneto, with Ricardo Esteves moved to opposite direction. Biondini made his Serie A debut in 2005–06 Serie A. Circa January 2006 Reggina signed Biondini outright for another €700,000, with Simone Cavalli moved to opposite direction outright for €775,000.

Cagliari
On 31 August 2006, he left for Cagliari on loan for an undisclosed fee with an option to sign outright. In 2007 Cagliari excised the option.

Genoa
On 11 January 2012, he left for Genoa on free transfer in -year contract. (However the transfer also cost Genoa €500,000 as other fee.)

After a single season, signed a loan deal with the newly promoted Serie A club Atalanta on 24 August 2012 for €200,000.

Sassuolo
On 23 January 2014, Biondini left for Sassuolo in a temporary deal for €200,000, with an option to purchase, re-joining Genoa teammate Antonio Floro Flores (loan) and Thomas Manfredini (definitive). In June 2014 Sassuolo excised the options to purchase Biondini and Floro Flores from Genoa, for €1.3 million and €2.5 million respectively.

Back to Cesena
In July 2018, he returned to the city where he started his professional career, joining Cesena. Following Cesena's promotion back to Serie C at the end of the 2018–19 season, he retired from playing.

International career
With the Italy U-21 squad he took part at the 2006 Euro U-21 Championship. He wore the prestigious number 10 shirt, but just made one appearance as a substitute in the last match of the group stage.

Biondini made his senior national team debut on 14 November 2009 during a friendly match against the Netherlands.

Footnotes

References

External links
 
  
FIGC 
 

1983 births
Living people
Sportspeople from the Province of Forlì-Cesena
Italian footballers
A.C. Cesena players
L.R. Vicenza players
Reggina 1914 players
Cagliari Calcio players
Genoa C.F.C. players
Atalanta B.C. players
U.S. Sassuolo Calcio players
Serie A players
Serie B players
Serie D players
Association football midfielders
Italy youth international footballers
Italy under-21 international footballers
Italy international footballers
Footballers from Emilia-Romagna